The Grammy Award for Best Contemporary World Music Album was an honor presented to recording artists between 2004 and 2011 for quality contemporary world music albums. The Grammy Awards, an annual ceremony that was established in 1958 and originally called the Gramophone Awards, are presented by the National Academy of Recording Arts and Sciences of the United States to "honor artistic achievement, technical proficiency and overall excellence in the recording industry, without regard to album sales or chart position".

The Grammy Award for Best World Music Album was first presented at the 34th Grammy Awards in 1992. The category remained unchanged until 2004, when it was split into separate awards for Grammy Award for Best Traditional World Music Album and Best Contemporary World Music Album. The first award for Best Contemporary World Music Album was presented to Cesária Évora at the 46th Grammy Awards for the album Voz d'Amor. In 2011, a major overhaul of the Grammy categories resulted in the merge of the two awards to a single Best World Music Album category beginning in 2012.

Recipients

References

 
Album awards
Awards disestablished in 2011
Awards established in 2004
Contemporary World Music Album